Il-Lunzjata Valley (Maltese: Wied Il-Lunzjata) is an agricultural valley located southwest of Victoria, Gozo. The valley it's known for its lush fields and hospitaller-era chapel. Running freshwater is very common on the valley bottom during autumn and spring. This supply of freshwater is commonly put to use for the farming of crops in fields within the valley trough a number of channels dung on the ground. The valley is also home to an old fountain that makes use of the freshwater which was restored in 2007. Lunzjata is also considered a Natura 2000 site.

References 

Agricultural regions
Geography of Malta
Gozo
Valleys